The Silence Of December is the first full-length album from Deinonychus (band). It was released in May 1995, yet recorded in 1994. The album was released on Cacophonous Records from the UK.

Track listing

	Intro - Black Sun	                01:53
	I, Ruler of Paradise in Black	        06:30
	The Silence of December 4:32
	The Final Affliction of Xafan	        10:22
	A Shining Blaze over Darkland	        06:18
	Under the Autumn Tree	                07:07
	Here Lies My Kingdom	                07:38
	My Travels Through the Midnight Sky	07:33
	Red Is My Blood... Cold Is My Heart	05:55
	Outro - Bizarre Landscape	        02:05

External links
Metal Archives
Official Bandpage

1995 albums
Deinonychus (band) albums
Cacophonous Records albums